Infantry support guns are designed to provide direct organic support for infantry forces.  They fire a range of shells, primarily in a direct fire mode.

Towed infantry guns 
Most towed infantry guns are lightweight and capable of being manhandled for limited mobility to accompany infantry.

Self-propelled infantry guns 

A self-propelled infantry gun (assault gun) is an armored gun-armed vehicle designed to provide direct fire support for infantry and armored forces.  Typically, the gun is mounted in the hull and the front of the vehicle is heavily armored.

Notes and citations

References
 Zaloga, Steven J., James Grandsen (1984). Soviet Tanks and Combat Vehicles of World War Two, London: Arms and Armour Press. .

 
Infantry